Ahlamerestaq-e Jonubi Rural District is a rural district (dehestan) in the Central District of Mahmudabad County, Mazandaran Province, Iran. At the 2006 census, its population was 15,089, in 3,867 families. The rural district has 26 villages.

References 

Rural Districts of Mazandaran Province
Mahmudabad County